Henri Camille Préaux (25 November 1911 – 21 February 1992) was a French rowing coxswain who won a silver medal in the coxed pairs at the 1928 Summer Olympics.

References

1911 births
1992 deaths
Coxswains (rowing)
French male rowers
Olympic rowers of France
Olympic silver medalists for France
Rowers at the 1928 Summer Olympics
Olympic medalists in rowing
Medalists at the 1928 Summer Olympics
Sportspeople from Marne (department)
20th-century French people